Events from the year 1980 in Belgium

Incumbents
Monarch: Baudouin
Prime Minister: Wilfried Martens

Events
 23 January – Christian Democrat, Socialist, VU and FDF governing coalition replaced by Christian Democrat–Socialist coalition
 18 May – Christian Democrat–Socialist governing coalition replaced by Christian Democrat–Socialist–Liberal coalition
 7 August – Regional devolution passes the Senate
 22 October – Christian Democrat–Socialist–Liberal governing coalition replaced by Christian Democrat–Socialist coalition

Publications
 Hadewijch, The Complete Works, translated by Columba Hart (New York, Paulist Press)
 Ronald Eckford Mill Irving, The Flemings and Walloons of Belgium (London, Minority Rights Group)
 Rita Lejeune and Jacques Stiennon (eds.), La Wallonie, le Pays et les Hommes: Lettres, Arts, Culture, vol. 3 (La Renaissance du Livre, Brussels)

Births
6 January – Steed Malbranque, footballer

Deaths
 3 October – Albéric O'Kelly de Galway (born 1911), chess grandmaster

References

 
Belgium
Years of the 20th century in Belgium
1980s in Belgium
Belgium